Renat Saidov (born September 27, 1988) is a Russian judoka.

References

External links
 
 

1988 births
Living people
Judoka at the 2016 Summer Olympics
Olympic judoka of Russia
Russian male judoka
Sportspeople from Stavropol
European Games medalists in judo
Universiade medalists in judo
Universiade silver medalists for Russia
Universiade bronze medalists for Russia
Judoka at the 2015 European Games
European Games bronze medalists for Russia
Medalists at the 2011 Summer Universiade
Medalists at the 2013 Summer Universiade
21st-century Russian people